Henrik Udahl (born 12 January 1997) is a Norwegian football striker who plays for HamKam.

Hailing from Askim, he tried his luck at junior football in Vålerenga. Not offered a senior contract, he started his senior career with mediocre Follo before moving to Bergen to study. Here, he became a prolific goalscorer on third and fourth tier with Fana, then third and second tier with Åsane. After becoming top goalscorer of the 2020 1. divisjon he earned a transfer back to Vålerenga.

References

1997 births
Living people
People from Askim
Norwegian footballers
Follo FK players
Fana IL players
Åsane Fotball players
Vålerenga Fotball players
Norwegian First Division players
Eliteserien players
Association football forwards
Sportspeople from Viken (county)